The Dan Band Live is the first album released by The Dan Band. It includes humorous covers of various pop songs.

Track listing
"Free Your Mind/I Am Woman"
"Gloria/Mickey"
"ABBA Medley"
"Shoop/Whatta Man/Never Gonna Get It"
"Genie in a Bottle/No Scrubs/Slave 4 U"
"Tyrone/No More Drama"
"Hold On/Luka"
"Milkshake"
"Total Eclipse of the Heart"
"Flashdance/Fame"
"Whenever Wherever/Hips Don't Lie" 
"You Oughta Know"
"Que Sera, Sera"
"I Wanna Rock You Hard This Christmas" (Bonus Track)
"Total Eclipse of the Heart" (Bonus Track - Studio Version)

2005 live albums
SideOneDummy Records live albums
The Dan Band albums
2000s comedy albums
Covers albums